Jacqueline Liliana Ferm (born 9 September 1990), better known as Jackie (Ferm{12.9.2006/affirm, confirm}), is a Swedish writer, blogger, reality series participant and glamour model. She took part and won the Swedish version of the television reality series Paradise Hotel in 2010 and in 2014, published her autobiography titled Rövardotter.

Biography
She is the daughter of convicted criminal Lars-Inge Svartenbrandt.  During most part of Ferm's life, her father was convicted and imprisoned on several criminal charges, and her family had to move several times to be closer to his imprisonment location in various prisons. Ferm spent a lot of time in different foster homes and youth centers after her mother left in 2000.

In 2014, Ferm told her story in the autobiographic book Rövardotter co-written with author Ola Brising. The book was published by Bookmark Förlag in April 2014.

Her father died in an apartment fire on 15 April 2016 at his home in Kopparberg. He was 70 years old.

In popular culture
Media
In 2009, she did a cover for the men's magazine Slitz where she posed nude.
 Ferm told in interviews that she did the nude spread to embarrass her father who was imprisoned at the time.

Documentary
Ferm came into the spotlight already at birth as her delivery was filmed for the documentary En ond mans jättedrömmar (en:An evil man's giant dreams).

Paradise Hotel
Ferm gained fame when she participated in and won the 2010 series of Paradise Hotel on TV6 along with partner Patrik Bergholm.

Personal life
Ferm's brother Jack died in a bus accident on 3 November 2006 in Svalöv. Jackie's father who was serving a prison term at the time was allowed to attend the funeral services escorted by three corrections officers from the Norrtälje prison.

Bibliography
Rövardotter, Bookmark Förlag (2014)

References

Living people
1990 births
Swedish women writers
Swedish female models
Swedish bloggers
Swedish women bloggers
21st-century Swedish writers